Keller is a surname with several origins. The Irish version, which is the most ancient in origin, comes from the Gaelic surname Ó Ceilechair. In modern German Keller means cellar or basement, but historically it designates a cellarer or winemaker. A Latinized form of "Keller" is "Cellarius".

Keller is an Anglicized version of the Old Irish surname Ó Céilechair (meaning descendant of Céilechar). Céilechair was descended from Cennétig mac Lorcáin King of the Dál gCais in modern-day Clare. Cennétig mac Lorcáin was the ancestor and progenitor of the Keller family, and also of the Kennedys and O'Briens of Munster.

The Anglicized surname in Ireland has many different spellings including: O'Kelleher, Kelaher, Kelliher, Kellar, Keller, McKeller, MacKeller, and O'Keller.

People whose surname is or was Keller include:

 Adam Keller, Israeli peace activist and soldier
 Adolf Keller (1872–1963), Swiss Protestant theologian
 Al Keller, American race car driver
 Albert Keller (1844–1920), German painter
 Albert Galloway Keller (1874–1956), American sociologist and author
 Alfred Keller (1882–1974), German general
 Amanda Keller (born 1962), Australian TV personality and actress
 Andrea Keller (born 1973), Australian jazz musician
 Andreas Keller (born 1965), German field hockey player
 Arthur I. Keller (1867–1924), American illustrator
 Augustin Keller (1805–1883), Swiss politician
 Bernhard Keller (born 1964), Swiss mathematician
 Bill Keller (born 1949), American editor
 Brad Keller (disambiguation), several people
 Carlos Keller, Chilean academic and politician.
 Carsten Keller, German field hockey player
 Chaim Dov Keller, rabbi and rosh yeshiva in Chicago
 Charlie Keller, US baseball player
 Chris Keller, a fictional character in the Arthur Miller play All My Sons
 Christopher Keller, a fictional character in the American television series Oz
 Clayton Keller, American ice hockey player
 David H. Keller (1880–1966), American science fiction writer
 Donald G. Keller (born 1951), American science fiction and fantasy editor and critic
 Elisabetta Keller (1891–1969), Swiss-Italian artist
 Émile Keller (1828–1909), French writer and politician
 Erhard Keller (born 1944), German ice skater
 Erwin Keller, German field hockey player
 Evelyn Fox Keller, American scientist
 Ferdinand Keller (disambiguation), several people
 Franz Keller (psychologist) (1913–1991), Swiss psychologist, Christian pacifist and left-wing news editor
 Franz Keller (born 1945), West German Nordic combined skier
 Fred S. Keller (1899–1996), American pioneer in experimental psychology
 Friedrich von Keller (diplomat) (1873–1960), German diplomat (father of Rupprecht)
 Friedrich von Keller (painter) (1840–1914), German landscape painter
 Friedrich Ludwig von Keller (1799–1860), German-Swiss jurist
 Fyodor Keller, Russian general
 George Keller (academic) (1928–2007), American scholar and academic administrator
 George Keller (architect) (1842–1935), Irish-born American architect and engineer
 George Frederick Keller (1846–?), political cartoonist
 Gerold Keller, Swiss curler
 Gerta Keller (born 1945), American paleontologist
 Gottfried Keller (1819–1890), Swiss writer
 Hannes Keller, Swiss physicist and mathematician
 Hans Keller (1919–1985), Austrian-born British musician and writer 
 Hans Peter Keller (1915–1988), German poet
 Harold Keller (1921–1979), American Marine, flag raiser at Iwo Jima
 Helen Keller, American blind and deaf author and activist
 Hubert Keller, French chef
 Jack Keller (artist) (1922–2003), comic book artist
 Jack Keller (athlete), former world record holder, 110 hurdles, set July 1932
 "Gentleman" Jack Keller (poker player) (died 2003), poker player
 Jack Keller (songwriter) (1936–2005)
 Jacob Keller (1568–1631)
 James Keller (1900–1977), Irish-American priest in the Maryknoll Order
 Jan Keller (born 1955), Moravian sociologist, environmentalist and politician
 Jason Keller (born 1970), NASCAR racing driver
 Jennifer Keller, fictional M.D. on the SciFi TV series Stargate Atlantis
 Jerry Keller (born 1937), American pop singer and songwriter
 Jim Keller, American musician
 Jim Keller (engineer)
 Johann Baptist von Keller (1774–1845), German bishop
 Joseph B. Keller (1923–2016), American mathematician
 Kasey Keller (born 1969), US former soccer player
 Kathryn Keller, American visual artist
 Kevin Lane Keller (born 1956), US professor of marketing
 Klete Keller (born 1982), US former competition swimmer
 K. T. Keller (1885–1966), president and chairman of Chrysler Corporation, and Defense Department "missile czar" in 1950s
 Laurent Keller (born 1961), Swiss evolutionary biologist
 Louis Keller, assembled and published the New York Social Register
 Marc Keller (born 1968), French footballer
 Maria Keller, American philanthropist
 Mark Keller (born 1965), German actor
 Markus Keller (triathlete) (born 1967), Swiss triathlete
 Marthe Keller (born 1945)
 Matthew Keller (born 1810), Irish-born American agriculturalist, vintner, and distiller
 May Lansfield Keller (1877–1964), American academic and dean
 Mitch Keller (born 1996), American baseball player
 Nuh Ha Mim Keller, Muslim scholar (alim), legal expert and jurist (faqih), translator of classical Arabic texts (Reliance of the Traveller), and Mystic of the Shadhili order of Sufis
 Ott-Heinrich Keller, mathematician
 Otto Keller (footballer)
 Otto Keller (philologist), German classical philologist
 Peter G. Keller (1894–1972), New York stamp dealer
 Pius Keller (1825–1904)
 Rainer Keller (1965–2022), German politician (SPD)
 Ric Keller (born 1964), American politician, author, and lawyer
 Rita Keller (1933–2005), All-American Girls Professional Baseball League player
 Robert Keller (disambiguation), several people
 Rod Keller (1900–1954), Canadian general
 Ronny Keller (born 1979), former Swiss hockey player 
 Rupprecht von Keller (1910–2003), German lawyer and diplomat (son of Friedrich)
 Sharon Keller (born 1953), controversial Texas Criminal Court of Appeals judge
 Thomas Keller, American chef
 Thomas Keller (card game player), American poker player
 Timothy J. Keller, pastor of Redeemer Presbyterian Church in New York City
 Tina Keller-Jenny (1887–1985), Swiss physician and Jungian psychotherapist
 Ursula Keller (born 1959), Swiss physicist and professor at ETH Zurich
 Wade Keller, editor-in-chief of Pro Wrestling Torch newsletter and website
 Walter Keller (disambiguation), several people
 Wes Keller (born 1946), member of the Alaska House of Representatives
 William Keller (disambiguation), several people
Karin Keller-Sutter, Swiss German politician

See also
 Kellar
 Kelleher
 Kellerman

References

Anglicised Irish-language surnames
German-language surnames
Irish families
Jewish surnames
Gaelic-language surnames
Surnames of Irish origin
Occupational surnames